John Johnstone may refer to:

Politics
John Johnstone (mayor) (1661–1732), mayor of New York, 1714–1719
Sir John Johnstone, 1st Baronet (died 1711), Scottish army officer and politician
John Johnstone (East India Company) (1734–1795), officer of the British East India Company, MP for Dysart Burghs 1774–80
Sir John Johnstone, 6th Baronet (1783–1811), British army officer and politician
John Heywood Johnstone (1850–1904), British barrister and Conservative Party politician
John Johnstone (Australian politician) (1857–1931), member of the Victorian Legislative Assembly

Sports
Jock Johnstone (fl. 1920s), Scottish footballer for Aston Villa
John Johnstone (athlete) (1892–1969), American Olympic track and field athlete
John Johnstone (English footballer), English footballer for Port Vale
John Johnstone (footballer, born 1869) (1869–1953), Scottish footballer (Kilmarnock FC and Scotland)
John Johnstone (baseball) (born 1968), American professional baseball player

Other
John Johnstone (physician) (1768–1836), British doctor and biographer
John Henry Johnstone (1749–1828), Irish actor and singer
John Johnstone (businessman) (1881–1935), British businessman and jockey
John Young Johnstone, Canadian Impressionist painter

See also
John Johnston (disambiguation)
John Hope-Johnstone (disambiguation)